Zabrus punctiventris is a species of ground beetle in the Pterostichinae subfamily that can be found in Near East, Greece and Turkey.

References

Beetles described in 1864
Beetles of Asia
Beetles of Europe
Zabrus
Taxa named by Hermann Rudolph Schaum